Aadya Bedi is an Indian theater artist and Bollywood actress. She has appeared in several Bollywood movies, played a role in the American police procedural television drama series Law & Order: Criminal Intent and has appeared in New York International Fringe Festival shows.

Aadya Bedi is the niece of famous actor Kabir Bedi.

Career

Aadya Bedi made her debut in Dev Benegal's 1999 Indian film Split Wide Open. Her second movie came after a gap of eleven years. During her absence from Bollywood, Bedi was working in theater and in American television.

Filmography

Films

Television

See also

Cinema of India
Bollywood
Kabir Bedi
Law & Order: Criminal Intent
Fireflies
Split Wide Open

References

External links

Indian film actresses
Living people
Actresses from Mumbai
Actresses in Hindi cinema
Indian stage actresses
Year of birth missing (living people)
Actresses in Hindi television
21st-century Indian actresses